was a Japanese mathematician who did fundamental work in the theory of several complex variables.

Biography

Oka was born in Osaka. He went to Kyoto Imperial University in 1919, turning to mathematics in 1923  and graduating in 1924.

He was in Paris for three years from 1929, returning to Hiroshima University. He published solutions to the first and second Cousin problems, and work on domains of holomorphy, in the period 1936–1940. He received his Doctor of Science degree from Kyoto Imperial University in 1940. These were later taken up by Henri Cartan and his school, playing a basic role in the development of sheaf theory.

The Oka–Weil theorem is due to a work of André Weil in 1935 and Oka's work in 1937.

Oka continued to work in the field, and proved Oka's coherence theorem in 1950.  Oka's lemma is also named after him.

He was a professor at Nara Women's University from 1949 to retirement at 1964. He received many honours in Japan.

Honors
 1951 Japan Academy Prize
 1954 Asahi Prize
 1960 Order of Culture
 1973 Order of the Sacred Treasure, 1st class

Bibliography
KIYOSHI OKA COLLECTED PAPERS
 - Includes bibliographical references.

Selected papers (Sur les fonctions analytiques de plusieurs variables) 
 PDF TeX

References

External links

Oka library at NWU
Photos of Prof. Kiyoshi Oka
 Related to Works of Dr. Kiyoshi OKA
 Oka Mathematical Institute

1901 births
1978 deaths
People from Osaka
Kyoto University alumni
20th-century Japanese mathematicians
Complex analysts
Mathematical analysts
Japanese essayists
Academic staff of Kyoto University
Recipients of the Order of the Sacred Treasure, 1st class
Recipients of the Order of Culture
Academic staff of Hiroshima University
20th-century essayists
Academic staff of Nara Women's University